Abu Sa'id Ahmed ibn Mohammed ibn Abd al-Jalil al-Sijzi (c. 945 - c. 1020, also known as al-Sinjari and al-Sijazi; ; Al-Sijzi is short for "Al-Sijistani") was an Iranian Muslim astronomer, mathematician, and astrologer. He is notable for his correspondence with al-Biruni and for proposing that the Earth rotates around its axis in the 10th century.

He dedicated work to 'Adud al-Daula, who was probably his patron, and to the prince of Balkh. He also worked in Shiraz making astronomical observations from 969 to 970.

Mathematics
Al-Sijzi studied intersections of conic sections and circles. He replaced the old kinematical trisection of an angle by a purely geometric solution (intersection of a circle and an equilateral hyperbola.)

Earth's rotation
Al-Biruni tells us that Al-Sijzi invented an astrolabe, called "al-zūraqī", whose design was based on the idea that the Earth rotates:

Al-Biruni also referred to Al-Sijzi as a prominent astronomer who defended the theory that the earth rotates in al-Qānūn al-Masʿūdī.

The fact that some people did believe that the earth is moving on its own axis is further confirmed by a reference from the 13th century which states: "According to the geometers [or engineers] (muhandisīn), the earth is in constant circular motion, and what appears to be the motion of the heavens is actually due to the motion of the earth and not the stars."

References

Sources
 
 Suter, Heinrich: Die Mathematiker und Astronomen der Araber und ihre Werke (80–81, 224, 1900).

Further reading

External links
  (PDF version)

Medieval Iranian astrologers
10th-century Iranian mathematicians
11th-century Iranian mathematicians
940s births
1020 deaths
Year of birth uncertain
10th-century Iranian astronomers
Scholars under the Buyid dynasty
10th-century inventors
11th-century Iranian astronomers
Astronomers of the medieval Islamic world